The Church report on detainee interrogation and incarceration (officially Review of Department of Defense Detention Operations and Detainee Interrogation Techniques) is a report completed under the direction of Vice Admiral Albert T. Church, an officer in the United States Navy. Church was then the Naval Inspector General.

Church's mandate was to investigate the interrogation and incarceration of detainees in the United States "war on terror", in Afghanistan, Iraq and Guantanamo Bay. The inquiry was initiated on May 25, 2004. A version of its report was finished on March 2, 2005 and published on March 11.

An unclassified 21-page executive summary has been circulated. The full 368-page report is classified.

Church and his staff interviewed 800 individuals, Washington policy-makers, Armed Services members, and allies of the United States. Human Rights Watch reports that the Church inquiry didn't interview any detainees.

Highlights
The inquiry concluded that 26 deaths in custody merited homicide charges.
Senior officers ignored warning signs, like the reports submitted to them by the Red Cross.

Unredacted version published

On February 11, 2009, the American Civil Liberties Union received an unredacted copy of the report. They published an excerpt allegedly proving illegal abuses of power had resulted in the death of several individuals.

Original 2005 Church Report redacted release
Part 1
Part 2
Part 3
Church Report
Further Church Report material released in litigation
Report p.281,  released April 2008
Report pp. 353-365, released April 2008
Report pp.235 & 242, released January 2009

See also
Fay Report
Ryder Report

References

External links
Church Report Falls Short of Establishing Accountability; PHR Calls for Independent Commission to Investigate Torture by US Forces in Iraq, Afghanistan, Guantánamo, Physicians for Human Rights March 14, 2005
New Interrogation Rules Set for Detainees in Iraq, reprint from The New York Times, March 10, 2005
US Military Says 26 Inmate Deaths May Be Homicide, reprint from The New York Times, March 16, 2005
Abuse Review Exonerates Policy: Low-Level Leaders and Confusion Blamed, The Washington Post March 10, 2005
Center for Constitutional Rights Says Rumsfeld Must be Held Accountable for Inmate Homicides in Iraq And Afghanistan,

Counterterrorism in the United States
Guantanamo Bay detention camp
Reports of the United States government